A Blighted Life is an 1880 book by Rosina Bulwer Lytton chronicling the events surrounding her incarceration in a Victorian madhouse by her husband Edward Bulwer-Lytton, 1st Baron Lytton and her subsequent release a few weeks later. This was at a time when men could lock up socially inconvenient female relatives in psychiatric institutions.

References

Further reading
Bulwer Lytton, Rosina. A Blighted Life. Ed. Marie Mulvey-Roberts. Bristol, England: Thoemmes Press, 1994.  (Originally published in 1880 by The London Publishing Office).
Bulwer Lytton, Rosina. Cheveley. Ed. Marie Mulvey-Roberts.  London: Pickering & Chatto, 2005.
Bulwer Lytton, Rosina. Shells in the Sands of Time.  Ed. Marie Mulvey-Roberts.  Bristol, England: Thoemmes Press, 1995. 
Bulwer Lytton, Edward. Letters of the late Edward Bulwer, Lord Lytton, to his wife: With extracts from her MSS. "Autobiography" and other documents. Ed. Louisa Devey. New York: AMS Press, 1976. 
Cobbold of Knebworth, David Lytton Cobbold. A Blighted Marriage. Knebworth: The Knebworth House Education and Preservation Trust, 1999. 
Miles, Patricia and Jill Williams. An Uncommon Criminal. Knebworth: Knebworth House Education and Preservation Trust, 1999.
Mulvey-Roberts, Marie and Steve Carpenter, Eds. The Collected Letters of Rosina Bulwer Lytton. London: Pickering & Chatto, 2008.

External links
 

1880 non-fiction books
Psychology-related autobiographies
Books about psychiatric hospitals
Memoirs of imprisonment
Edward Bulwer-Lytton